Serbia competed at the 2019 World Aquatics Championships in Gwangju, South Korea from 12 to 28 July.

Artistic swimming

Serbia's artistic swimming team consisted of 2 athletes (2 female).

Women

Open water swimming

Serbia qualified one male open water swimmer.

Swimming

Serbia's swimming team consisted of 7 athletes (6 male, 1 female).

Men

Women

Water polo

Summary

Men's tournament

Team roster

Strajo Risticevic
Dušan Mandić
Viktor Rašović
Sava Ranđelović
Miloš Ćuk
Đorđe Lazić
Nemanja Vico
Nikola Dedović
Nikola Jakšić
Radomir Drašović
Ognjen Stojanović
Strahinja Rašović
Lazar Dobozanov
Coach: Dejan Savić

Group A

Quarterfinals

5th–8th place semifinals

5th place game

References

World Aquatics Championships
Nations at the 2019 World Aquatics Championships
2019